Boiler may refer to:
Boiler, a device for heating, but not necessarily boiling, water
Boiler (power generation), a device that boils liquid to generate power
Boiler (water heating), a device for heating water
"Boiler" (song), a 2000 song by Limp Bizkit
"The Boiler", a 1982 song by Rhoda Dakar and the Specials

See also
Electric boiler
Potboiler
Steam generator (disambiguation)